Gregory Charles Bennet (born 7 April 1963) is an Australian bishop of the Catholic Church. He is the bishop of the Diocese of Sale, having been appointed to the position in 2020.  He previously served in the Archdiocese of Melbourne and became its vicar general of in 2012.

Early life
Bennet was born on 7 April 1963 in the Archdiocese of Melbourne. He was the second of four children of Len and Maureen Bennet, and was raised in Canterbury and Balwyn North. His family moved to Bullengarook during his teenage years, and he graduated from Braemar College in Woodend. Bennet went on to study economics and administration, and later worked for the Commercial Bank of Australia.  Starting in 1986, he attended seminary at the Melbourne Regional Seminary, subsequently finishing his studies at the Catholic Theological College.  In 1992, Bennet was ordained to the Catholic priesthood by Frank Little, the Archbishop of Melbourne at the time.

Episcopal ministry
Bennet was appointed Bishop of Sale on 27 June 2020.

References

External links

1963 births
21st-century Roman Catholic bishops in Australia
Living people
People from Melbourne
Roman Catholic bishops of Sale